Ľudovít Klein (born February 22, 1995) is a Slovak mixed martial artist who competes in the Lightweight division of the Ultimate Fighting Championship.

Background
Ľudovít Klein was born in Nové Zámky, where he also started his sports career. When he was about 12 years old, Klein secretly signed up for boxing training as he feared his parents' reaction. After the first training sessions he was already aware that martial arts would accompany him throughout his life. Later, the boxing club he was involved in broke up and for some time he did not know which direction to take. As he wanted to continue his hobby, he signed up for Brazilian Jiu-Jitsu training. He trained for a long time in the Thomas Bilishich Martial Arts Academy. He later added Thai boxing to his martial arts training, which is how he first heard about the amateur MMA league. Subsequently, he started to devote himself to it.

In the beginning he earned his living as a bouncer at discos, where he was often picked on because of his shorter stature.

Mixed martial arts career

Early career
Klein joined the professional MMA as a relatively experienced amateur. After a couple of performances on smaller Slovak shows, his potential was noticed by the Slovak MMA legend Attila Végh, who brought him to his gym based on his great performances. On the domestic scene, Lajoš went undefeated in his first six fights in smaller Slovak organizations, after which he decided to go abroad.

The first match outside Slovakia did not turn out as expected. Klein lost to Igor Tarytsa at A-Fight 5 via KO. He won 2 matches in the ACB, and managed to finish both in the second round. He returned to Slovakia for one match against Moric Besztercei, which he left as the winner.

He came to the British Cage Warriors as a favorite, but he fell short, losing to Aiden Lee . He finished Lajoš in the first round via submission and Klein decided to return home to Slovakia.

With a record of 9-2, Klein transferred to Oktagon MMA. In it he fought two times, giving dominant performances and winning both fights before the limit. In the second match against Matěj Kuzník, he headlined Oktagon 5.

Subsequently, he bounced for 2 matches in the competing XFN. In both, he won the bouts comfortably, but decided to return to the Oktagon due to problems in the organization.

In the Oktagon 12 tournament, he defeated the Brazilian William Lima in the first round, followed by wins against João Paulo Rodrigues at Oktagon 14 and Łukasz Sajewski at Oktagon Prime 3, ending both subsequent matches with his signature head kick.

Ultimate Fighting Championship
Klein, as a replacement for Nate Landwehr, faced Shane Young on 27 September 2020 at UFC 253. At the weigh-ins, Klein weighed in at 150 pounds, four pounds over the non-title featherweight fight limit. The bout proceeded at a catchweight and Klein was fined a percentage of  his purse, which went to Young. Klein won the fight via knockout in round one.

Klein faced Michael Trizano on May 8, 2021 at UFC on ESPN: Rodriguez vs. Waterson. He lost the fight via unanimous decision. 11 out of 14 media scores gave the fight to Klein.
 
Klein faced Nate Landwehr  on October 16, 2021 at UFC Fight Night: Ladd vs. Dumont. He lost the fight in the third round via a submission due to an anaconda choke.

Klein faced Devonte Smith, replacing injured Erick Gonzalez, on March 5, 2022, at UFC 272. He won the fight via split decision.

Klein was scheduled to face Ignacio Bahamondes on August 30, 2022 at UFC 277. However, Bahamondes pulled out on July 15, 2022 and Klein was rebooked against Mason Jones a week earlier at UFC Fight Night: Blaydes vs. Aspinall. He won the fight via unanimous decision.

Klein faced Jai Herbert on March 18, 2023 at UFC 286. The fight ended in a majority draw.

Mixed martial arts record

|-
|Draw
|align=center|19–4–1
|Jai Herbert
|Draw (majority)
|UFC 286
|
|align=center|3
|align=center|5:00
|London, England
|
|-
|Win
|align=center|19–4
|Mason Jones
|Decision (unanimous)
|UFC Fight Night: Blaydes vs. Aspinall 
|
|align=center|3
|align=center|5:00
|London, England
|
|-
|Win
|align=center|18–4
|Devonte Smith
|Decision (split)
|UFC 272
|
|align=center|3
|align=center|5:00
|Las Vegas, Nevada, United States
|
|-
|Loss 
| align=center|17–4
| Nate Landwehr
|Submission (anaconda choke)
|UFC Fight Night: Ladd vs. Dumont
|
|align=center|3
|align=center|2:22
|Las Vegas, Nevada, United States
|
|-
| Loss
| align=center|17–3
| Michael Trizano
|Decision (unanimous)
|UFC on ESPN: Rodriguez vs. Waterson
|
|align=center|3
|align=center|5:00
|Las Vegas, Nevada, United States
|
|-
| Win
| align=center|17–2
| Shane Young
|KO (head kick and punches)
|UFC 253
|
|align=center|1
|align=center|1:16
|Abu Dhabi, United Arab Emirates
|
|-
| Win
| align=center|16–2
| Łukasz Sajewski
| TKO (punches)
| Oktagon Prime 3
| 
| align=center|1
| align=center|3:49
| Šamorín, Slovakia
|
|-
| Win
| align=center|15–2
| João Paulo Rodrigues
| KO (head kick)
|Oktagon 14
|
|align=center|3
|align=center|0:46
|Bratislava, Slovakia
| 
|-
| Win
| align=center| 14–2
|Willian Lima
| TKO (punches)
| Oktagon 12
| 
| align=center| 1
| align=center| 2:27
| Bratislava, Slovakia
|
|-
| Win
| align=center| 13–2
|Arbi Mezhidov
|Decision (unanimous)
|XFN 14
|
|align=center|3
|align=center|5:00
|Bratislava, Slovakia
|
|-
| Win
| align=center|12–2
|Kamil Selwa
|TKO (punches)
|XFN 11
|
|align=center|2
|align=center|N/A
|Prague, Czech Republic
|
|-
| Win
| align=center| 11–2
| Matěj Kuzník
|TKO (doctor stoppage)
|Oktagon 5
|
|align=center|4
|align=center|5:00
|Ostrava, Czech Republic
|
|-
| Win
| align=center| 10–2
| Krzysztof Klaczek
| KO (head kick)
| Oktagon 4
| 
| align=center| 1
| align=center| 2:00
| Bratislava, Slovakia
|
|-
| Loss
| align=center|9–2
| Aiden Lee
| Submission (rear-naked choke)
| Cage Warriors 87
| 
| align=center| 1
| align=center| 2:34
| Newport, Wales
| 
|-
| Win
| align=center|9–1
| Moric Besztercei
| Submission (rear-naked choke)
|Dark Night Volume 2
|
| align=center|1
| align=center|4:56
|Nové Zámky, Slovakia
|
|-
| Win
| align=center|8–1
| Ahmed Abdulkadirov
| Submission (guillotine choke)
| ACB 60
| 
|align=center|2
|align=center|0:44
| Vienna, Austria
| 
|-
| Win
| align=center|7–1
| Khusein Maltsagov
| KO (knee)
| ACB 56
| 
| align=center| 2
| align=center| 3:29
| Minsk, Belarus
| 
|-
| Loss
| align=center|6–1
| Igor Tarytsa
|KO (punch)
|A-Fight 5
|
|align=center| 1
|align=center| 4:58
|Nevinnomyssk, Russia
|
|-
| Win
| align=center| 6–0
|Aleksandar Janković
|Submission (armbar)
|Fight of Gladiators 5
|
|align=center|1
|align=center|N/A
|Nitra, Slovakia
|
|-
| Win
| align=center| 5–0
| Michal Stefek
| Submission (guillotine choke)
| Hanuman Cup 30
| 
| align=center| 1
| align=center| 0:40
| Bratislava, Slovakia
| 
|-
| Win
| align=center| 4–0
| Samuel Ribansky
|Submission (armbar)
|Hanuman Cup 28
|
|align=center|2
|align=center|0:00
|Bratislava, Slovakia
|
|-
| Win
| align=center|3–0
| Adam Németh
|Submission (guillotine choke)
|Hanuman Cup 27
|
| align=center|1
| align=center|1:00
|Senec, Slovakia
|
|-
| Win
| align=center| 2–0
| Kamil Tarnawski
| Submission (triangle choke)
|PCF 12
|
| align=center|2
| align=center|1:35
|Poprad, Slovakia
|
|-
| Win
| align=center|1–0
| Martin Mihálik
| Submission (rear-naked choke)
|PCF 11
|
|align=center|1
|align=center|0:27
|Levoča, Slovakia
|

See also 
 List of current UFC fighters
 List of male mixed martial artists

References

External links 
  
  

1995 births
Living people
Slovak male mixed martial artists
Featherweight mixed martial artists
Mixed martial artists utilizing boxing
Mixed martial artists utilizing Muay Thai
Mixed martial artists utilizing Brazilian jiu-jitsu
Ultimate Fighting Championship male fighters
Slovak Muay Thai practitioners
Slovak practitioners of Brazilian jiu-jitsu
People from Nové Zámky
Sportspeople from the Nitra Region